Nona is a women's magazine published in Malaysia. It has been published monthly in the Malay language by Shah Alam-based Kumpulan Media Karangkraf Sdn Bhd (Karangkraf) since November 1986.  The magazine's tagline is "Realiti Impian Wanita", literally meaning the 'Reality of Women's Dream'.

Beside its print version, Nona has been published digitally online since 2012. On 2 May 2018, Karangkraf entered a joint venture with Astro Malaysia Holdings (Astro) to establish Nu Ideaktiv Sdn Bhd to manage Nona and others magazines of the group. The magazine targets the 25 – 45 years old female readers market. The statistics of Google Analytics in June 2020 show the print version of the magazine has a circulation of 30,000 copies monthly while the digital website has 2.16 million visitors, 8.29 million page views as well as 274 thousand Facebook followers and 1.01 million average reach and also 256 thousand Instagram followers.

Nona is a prestigious women's lifestyle Malay magazine featuring the Malaysian royalty, social elite, top celebrities and influencers. It also covers the latest fashion, lifestyle and beauty trends as well as exclusive interviews and success stories.

Awards and recognitions presented

Nona Superwoman Award
Nona as a women's magazine in Malaysia has organised and presented the Nona Superwoman Award to honour outstanding individuals especially women who have contributed to good causes in various fields. Former cabinet minister, Rafidah Aziz was first to receive the inaugural Nona Superwoman Award in 2018. At the 2020 Nona Superwoman Award, Dr Siti Hasmah Mohamad Ali, wife of former Prime Minister Dr Mahathir Mohamad was the main recipient meanwhile Dr Noor Hisham Abdullah, Health Director-General leading the fight against COVID-19 pandemic in Malaysia was honoured with a special Nona Frontliner Award.

Nona Superhero Award
In December 2021, the Nona magazine and Ideaktiv started presented the Nona Superhero Award for especially to top excelled men in the country as a continuity of the Nona Superwoman Award. The inaugural recipients men among others were Dr Noor Hisham Abdullah for second time again, who had received 2020 Nona Superwoman Award a year earlier and youth politician Syed Saddiq Syed Abdul Rahman.

Awards and recognitions received
Nona has managed to garner some awards and recognitions notably the MPA Magazine Awards of Magazine Publishers Association Malaysia. Among the awards are :

 2014 MPA Magazine Awards – Silver Award – Category Women – Bahasa Melayu
 2016 MPA Magazine Awards – Bronze Award – Category Women – Bahasa Melayu

See also

 List of women's magazines
 List of magazines in Malaysia

References

External links
 Official website

1986 establishments in Malaysia
Magazines established in 1986
Magazines published in Malaysia
Mass media in Shah Alam
Malay-language magazines
Monthly magazines
Women's magazines
Feminist magazines
Celebrity magazines
Women's fashion magazines
Entertainment magazines
Health magazines
Astro Malaysia Holdings
Astro Malaysia Holdings subsidiaries